The IIHF 12 Nations Invitational Tournament Series was held in Vierumäki, Finland (August 24–31), Courchevel, France (August 28–30), and Füssen, Germany (November 9–13). The competing nations will be the national women's teams. This is a new tournament introduced by the International Ice Hockey Federation. The goal is to close the large gaps in skill between countries by providing more competitive opportunities. The eight competing countries in Vierumaki, Finland are Canada, United States, Finland, Sweden, Russia, Switzerland, Slovakia and Japan. France, Germany, Norway and the Czech Republic also played in a mini-tournament simultaneously in Courchevel, France. Teams from Group B and C played in the tournament held in Füssen.

There were no medals awarded at the tournament, and its main purpose was to develop players from countries attempting to qualify for the Olympic Games in 2014.

Mistaken Identity.  The name of the tournament was mistakenly printed on several publications and websites as the "IIHF 8 Nations Tournament".  The "IIHF 12 Nations Invitational Tournament Series" was the official name for the tournament.

Participating nations

Group A/B

Round robin
August 29: Jayna Hefford scored once in regulation time and twice in the shootout as Canada triumphed against the United States by a 4-3 mark in an exhibition game. Hilary Knight scored on the Americans' first two shots for a 2-0 lead just 1:55 in as Liz Knox was pulled from the game. Gillian Apps tallied a goal less than a minute after Knight’s second goal and Jocelyne Larocque evened at 7:41, as four goals were registered in the first eight minutes.

The teams exchanged goals late in the second period. Brianna Decker scored for the US, while Jayna Hefford replied with a power play goal. Afterwards, Genevieve Lacasse and Jessie Vetter made a combined 31 saves in the third period and overtime, forcing a shootout between the rivals. In the first five rounds of said shootout, Hefford and Kelli Stack traded goals. Afterwards, Hefford proceeded to give Canada another lead as she scored again in the shootout. Jennifer Wakefield followed to beat Vetter for the game winner.

August 24

August 25

August 27

August 28

August 30

August 31

September 2 and 3

Group C
All games for Group C were contested at the Olympic Ice Rink in Courchevel, France from August 28–30. Norway players Helene Martinsen led all Group C players in scoring with 8 points, while teammate Andrea Dalen ranked second in Group C scoring with 6 points.

Schedule

Group B/C
The tournament was played in Füssen, Germany from November 9–13.

Round robin
All teams took part in four games.

November 9

November 10

November 12

November 13

References

External news story
  Ouellette et les Canadiennes terminent avec une défaite
    Le Canada amorce le tournoi des 12 Nations avec un gain de 16-0
  Victoire in extremis des Canadiennes
 2011 Women's Twelve Nations Central
 U.S. Women's National Team Shuts Out Russia, 12-0, at 2011 Women's IIHF Twelve Nations Invitational Tournament Series
 U.S. Women's National Team Shuts Out Japan, 13-0, at 2011 Women's IIHF Twelve Nations Invitational Tournament Series
  U.S. Women's National Team Shuts Out Finland, 6-0, at 2011 Women's IIHF Twelve Nations Invitational Tournament Series

International Ice Hockey Federation tournaments
IIHF 12 Nations Tournament
Women's ice hockey tournaments
International ice hockey competitions hosted by Finland
International ice hockey competitions hosted by France
International ice hockey competitions hosted by Germany
Nations
Nations